Shelly Tal Meron (born 6 May 1979) is an Israeli politician currently serving as a member of the Knesset for Yesh Atid.

Biography 
Meron was born on 6 May 1979. She served in the Israeli Air Force for six years in various roles, including as a spokesperson, a flight instructor for Bell AH-1 Cobra pilots, and as an officer. She also worked for a technology company in Southeast Asia.

In the 2018 municipal elections, Meron ran for a seat on Tel Aviv City Council on the Yesh Atid Ticket, but was not elected.

She subsequently became the manager of Yesh Atid's campaign in central Israel. Ahead of the 2022 election for the Knesset, Meron was given the twenty-fifth spot on Yesh Atid's list, but was not elected as the party won twenty-four seats. However, she entered the Knesset on 1 February 2023 following the resignation of Yoel Razvozov.

Personal life 
Meron has a Bachelor's degree in political science from Tel Aviv University. She is married and has two children.

References

External links 

Living people
21st-century Israeli women politicians
Jewish Israeli politicians
Members of the 25th Knesset (2022–)
Jewish women politicians
Women members of the Knesset
Yesh Atid politicians
Tel Aviv University alumni
1979 births